Eleonora Ernestina von Daun, Marquise of Pombal (2 November 1721 – 3 January 1789) was the second wife of Portuguese statesman Sebastião José de Carvalho e Melo, 1st Marquis of Pombal. Born in Vienna, Austria, she was the daughter of Count Heinrich Reichard Lorenz von Daun (1673–1729) and Countess Maria Josepha Violante von Poymund und Payersberg (1691–1758).

In 1745, Eleanora met Sebastião José de Carvalho e Melo, a Portuguese diplomat who was in Vienna to serve as a mediator in the solution of a serious quarrel between the Holy Roman empress Maria Theresa and the Vatican; they resolved to marry in December of that year. However, Carvalho e Melo felt the Austrian climate was bad for his health and, at the advice of the physician Gerard van Swieten, he submitted his resignation and returned to Lisbon with his wife as 1749 was coming to an end. In 1759, her husband was made Count of Oeiras and, in 1769, Marquis of Pombal.

The Marquise of Pombal died seven years after her husband, aged 67, in the family palace in Rua Formosa (today called Rua de O Século), in Lisbon.

References

1721 births
1789 deaths